Janet Stewart (born March 3, 1967) has been the news anchor at CBWT in Winnipeg,  Manitoba, Canada since January 9, 2007.

Prior to that, she was news anchor at CKY-TV between August 2001 and November 2006.

Before she moved to Winnipeg, Stewart worked at CTV Halifax, and Global Maritimes also as news reporter and anchor.

Awards
In January 2014, Stewart was nominated for a Canadian Screen Award for Best Local News Anchor by the Academy of Canadian Cinema and Television. She has also been nominated for a Best News Anchor Gemini Award.

References

External links 
 CBC Manitoba - News at Six biography
 Popjournalism.com article

Canadian television news anchors
1967 births
Canadian women television journalists
Living people